Tarskoye is a rural locality (a selo) in Prigorodny District of the Republic of North Ossetia–Alania, Russia. Population:

Nomenclature
The modern name Tarskoye, is derived from the name of the villagers of Tärsh in mountainous Ingushetia. The historical name of the village is Angusht (Angushtē), from which the ethnonym Ingush originates, and translates from the Ingush language as “a place from where the sky/horizon is observed”.

History
Angusht was built in the 17th century and the first report of it was made in 1745 by prince Vakhushti of Kartli.  There is no exact data about the time of foundation of the village. It is known that Angusht was not originally a single village, but was a territorial society, consisting of several small tribal villages.  In 1845, the settlement of the banks along the Sunzha River by the Terek Cossacks began. The foundation of the Tarskaya stanitsa is associated with the emergence of the Sunzha Line. The stanitsa was built on the site of Ingush lands as fixated by Nikolay Zeidlits in 1873, mentioned in his letter to the government published in the scientific journal «News of the Caucasian Department of the Imperial Russian Geographical Society» in 1894:

Notable people
Issa Kodzoev (born 1938), writer, poet, and politician
Yunus-bek Yevkurov (born 1963), military officer and politician

Notes

References

Notes

Sources

Bibliography 
 

Rural localities in North Ossetia–Alania
History of Ingushetia